Mountain View is an unincorporated community in Stokes County, North Carolina, United States, approximately three miles northeast of King.

Unincorporated communities in Stokes County, North Carolina
Unincorporated communities in North Carolina